Sonya Anderson (born February 24, 1970) is an American politician who has served in the Missouri House of Representatives from the 131st district since 2013.

References

1970 births
Living people
Republican Party members of the Missouri House of Representatives
21st-century American politicians
Women state legislators in Missouri
21st-century American women politicians